Flaviana Matata (born June 9, 1987) is a Tanzanian beauty queen and fashion model. She is the one of top Seven list of models that have recorded the highest income in Africa mentioned by  2013 Forbes Africa. In 2017 she was mentioned by okay.com as the one of Top 100 Women in Africa

Early life and education
She was born and raised in Shinyanga Tanzania. She was mostly raised by her father after the death of her mother, who died in the sinking of MV Bukoba during 1996. She attended Kowak Girls Mission Secondary School for her secondary education, and then she did a diploma course in electrical engineering at Arusha Technical College before heading to Miss Universe Tanzania.

Miss Universe 2007
Matata won the first edition of the Miss Universe Tanzania pageant in 2007, and went on to represent her country in the Miss Universe pageant the same year, where she was placed among the top 15 semifinalists and ended up in 6th place after the evening gown competition. She was the first contestant from Tanzania to compete at Miss Universe 2007, and compete with a shaved head.

Awards, recognition and nominations

References

Miss Universe 2007 contestants
Tanzanian female models
People from Shinyanga Region
1987 births
Living people
Tanzanian beauty pageant winners